Cédric Pineau (born 8 May 1985) is a French former road bicycle racer, who rode professionally between 2007 and 2017 with the ,  and  teams.

Major results

2006
 1st Troyes–Dijon
2007
 1st Troyes–Dijon
2008
 2nd Paris–Bourges
 4th Grand Prix de la Somme
 10th Grand Prix d'Isbergues
2009
 10th Grand Prix d'Isbergues
2010
 1st Paris–Troyes
 3rd Le Samyn
 3rd Tour du Finistère
 4th Overall Tour de Bretagne
1st Stage 6
 4th Overall Tour du Haut Var
 4th Overall Four Days of Dunkirk
 4th Overall Circuit de Lorraine
 4th Grand Prix de la Ville de Lillers
 4th Cholet-Pays de Loire
 4th Grand Prix de la Somme
 4th Tour de Vendée
 5th Classic Loire Atlantique
 7th Overall Tour du Poitou-Charentes
 10th De Vlaamse Pijl
2011
 8th Grand Prix d'Ouverture La Marseillaise
 9th Overall Tour du Haut Var
2013
 8th Tro-Bro Léon
 9th Tour du Finistère
2014
 3rd Tro-Bro Léon

Grand Tour general classification results timeline

References

External links

French male cyclists
1985 births
Living people
Sportspeople from Yonne
Cyclists from Bourgogne-Franche-Comté